Freedom of religion in Mauritania is limited by the Government. The constitution establishes the country as an Islamic republic and decrees that Islam is the religion of its citizens and the State.

Non-Muslim resident expatriates and a few non-Muslim citizens practice their religion openly with certain limitations on proselytization and transmission of religious materials.

Relations between the Muslim community and the small non-Muslim community are generally amicable.

Religious demography 
Almost all of the population are practicing Sunni Muslims, although there are a few non-Muslims. Roman Catholic and non-denominational Christian churches have been established in Nouakchott, Atar, Zouerate, Nouadhibou, and Rosso. A number of expatriates practice Judaism but there are no synagogues.

There are several foreign faith-based nongovernmental organizations (NGO's) active in humanitarian and developmental work in the country.

Status of religious freedom 
Islam is generally considered to be the essential cohesive element unifying the country's various ethnic groups and castes. There is a cabinet-level Ministry of Culture and Islamic Orientation and a High Council of Islam, consisting of six imams, which, at the Government's request, advises on the conformance of legislation to Islamic precepts.

Mosques and Qur'anic schools are funded privately by their members and other donors. One exception is a small stipend to the imam of the Central Mosque in the capital city of Nouakchott provided by the government.

The Government does not register religious groups; however, secular NGOs, inclusive of humanitarian and development NGO's affiliated with religious groups, must register with the Ministry of the Interior.

Nonprofit organizations, including both religious groups and secular NGO's, generally are not subject to taxation.

The judiciary consists of a single system of courts with a legal system that conforms with the principles of Shari'a (Islamic law).

The Government observes Muslim holidays as national holidays. A magistrate of Shari'a, who heads a separate government commission, decides the dates for observing religious holidays and addresses the nation on these holidays.

Restrictions on religious freedom 
There is no religious oath required of government employees or members of the ruling political party, except for the President and the members of the 5-person Constitutional Council and the 10-person High Council of Magistrates presided over by the President. The Constitutional Council and the High Council of Magistrates advise the President in matters of law and the Constitution. The oath of office includes a promise to God to uphold the law of the land in conformity with Islamic precepts.

In April 2018, the National Assembly passed a law making the death penalty mandatory for "blasphemy".

Proselytization to Muslims
Although there is no specific legal prohibition against proselytizing by non-Muslims, in practice the Government prohibits proselytizing by non-Muslims through the use of Article 11 of the Press Act, which bans the publication of any material that is against Islam or contradicts or otherwise threatens Islam. The Government views any attempts by practitioners of other religions to convert Muslims as undermining society. Foreign faith-based NGO's limit their activities to humanitarian and development assistance. Even so, in June 2009 American aid worker Chris Leggett was murdered for allegedly proselytizing, according to the Barnabas Fund.

Possession and distribution of Bibles
Under Article 11 of the Press Law, the Government may restrict the importation, printing, or public distribution of Bibles or other non-Islamic religious literature, and in practice Bibles are neither printed nor publicly sold in the country. However, the possession of Bibles and other non-Islamic religious materials in private homes is legal.

Shari'a provides the legal principles upon which the law and legal procedure are based. Mauritania follows the Maliki madhab, which has certain unique laws not applicable to other madhabs.

References

Religion in Mauritania
Mauritania
Human rights in Mauritania